Rumu (Rumuwa), or Kairi (Kai-Iri), is a Papuan language of Papua New Guinea. Other names for it are Dumu (Tumu) and Kibiri.

References

Turama–Kikorian languages
Languages of Papua New Guinea